John Clement (by 1502 – 1551/56), of Bath, Somerset, was an English politician.

He was a Member (MP) of the Parliament of England for Bath in 1539. He was Mayor of Bath in 1550–51.

References

1550s deaths
Mayors of Bath, Somerset
English MPs 1539–1540
Year of birth uncertain